The use of Nitratine or Chilean Saltpeter once an important source of nitrates for fertilizer and other chemical uses including gunpowder and fireworks.

The commencement of the export of nitrates to the Europe and the US in the 1830s marked the most important milestone in the history of the nitrate industry and brought consequences for the economies of the three countries sharing the Atacama Desert: Chile, Perú and Bolivia.

Antofagasta was founded in 1868, in October 1869 the extraction of nitrates commenced in Oficina Salar del Carmen, the first nitrate producing plant. In 1871, the Nitrate Railway was inaugurated, running from Iquique to La Noria in Peru. In 1873, the Peruvian Government established the Nitrate Trust (state monopoly), which was controlled from Tarapacá until the 1879–1883 "War of the Pacific". This political event was based on the boom of new "Oficinas salitreras" ("Saltpeter works") of quarrying nitratine to extract nitrate.

Since World War I the industry has been supplanted by fixing nitrogen from the air as the main source of nitrogen.

This is a list of saltpeter works in the Tarapacá and Antofagasta regions. The information regarding Saltpeter works on this page is compiled from the data supplied by the National Geospatial-Intelligence Agency, Country Files (GNS). Unique Feature Identifier (UFI) is a number which uniquely identifies a Geoname feature. Same UFI means same feature.

See also
 Pedro Gamboni

References

External links
 Album del Desierto maps, fotos, facts.
 Fichas Salitreras gives a list of salitreras, but without coordinates.

Saltpeter works in Chile
Atacama Desert
History museums in Chile
Industry museums
Museums in Tarapacá Region
Ghost towns in South America
Buildings and structures in Tarapacá Region
Former populated places in Chile
World Heritage Sites in Chile